The Sabin Point Light was a lighthouse in the Providence River. It was removed as part of a channel-widening project in 1968.

History
This light was constructed in 1872 to mark a bend in the shipping channel southwest of Sabin Point. The Second Empire style house was constructed according to a plan by Albert R. Dow, the winning design in a contest sponsored by the Lighthouse Service. Nearly identical lights were constructed at Colchester Reef, Pomham Rocks, Esopus Meadows Light and Rose Island. Initially the keeper also had responsibility for the beacon which was replaced in 1876 by the Bullock's Point Light.

The light weathered the hurricane of 1938 fairly well, albeit with serious flood damage to the first floor. The keeper's wife, Annie Whitford, was washed away three times, but managed not only to survive but to keep the light going through the storm. On a less perilous note, two of her daughters were married at the light, the second to the son of the keeper of the Warwick Light.

In 1956 the light was converted to electricity and automated. In 1968 widening of the shipping channel led the harbor authority to order the removal of the light, and it was burned down and the foundation razed. An automated beacon was placed on a dolphin nearby; the light was discontinued in 1989 and replaced with a day beacon.

References

Lighthouses completed in 1872
Lighthouses in Rhode Island
Buildings and structures demolished in 1968
1872 establishments in Rhode Island